The Landis Spinners (also known as the Senators, Dodgers and Millers) were a Class D minor league baseball team in Landis, North Carolina that existed from 1935–1951. They were a regional predecessor of today's Kannapolis Intimidators.

History

Landis played in the North Carolina State League (1937–1941, 1945–1947, 1949-1951). They were affiliate of the Brooklyn Dodgers in 1940.

During their existence, they were known as the Landis Spinners (1949–1951), Landis Millers (1945–1947), Landis Senators (1941–1942), Landis Dodgers (1940) and Landis Senators (1935, 1937–1939).

On July 18, 1951, the franchise moved to Elkin, North Carolina and became the Elkin Blanketeers.

The ballpark

Landis teams played home games at Landis Park at Landis High School. Today, the school is Corriher-Lipe Middle School, located at 214 W. Rice St.
Landis, NC 28088.

Notable alumni

 Ed Clary (1940)
 Herman Fink (1940)
 Rufe Gentry (1939)
 Jim Poole (1939, MGR)

References

Baseball Reference

Baseball teams established in 1935
Defunct minor league baseball teams
Brooklyn Dodgers minor league affiliates
Professional baseball teams in North Carolina
Defunct baseball teams in North Carolina
Baseball teams disestablished in 1951